Can-Am is a subsidiary of Bombardier Recreational Products (BRP), known mainly for its Can-Am Spyder three-wheeled motorcycle.

The company initially made motocross and enduro motorcycles, which were very competitive, before beginning to manufacture and sell all-terrain vehicles as well. Can-Am’s name was the result of a Bombardier employee competition based on the anticipated Canadian vs. American market, though the existence of the Can-Am racing series necessitated the purchase of rights to the name.

History

Early history 
Can-Am was spun off from BRP in 1972. The barn that housed the original Can-Am headquarters still exists at the Bombardier test facility within the Circuit Yvon Duhamel and is located a few miles south of Valcourt, Quebec. The right side of the barn housed the offices for design and engineering, and the left side was used for fabrication.

Based on the Bultaco design principle of a standard-size frame that could accommodate a range of differently sized engines, engineers Gary Robison, Bob Fisher, and Camille Picard, and seasoned motorcycle racer Jeff Smith designed a competition motorcycle from scratch. Their design featured steering head bearing cups that allowed for the adjustment of the steering head angle; these were mainly driven by simplified production on the assembly line.

In 1974, Can-Am won the American Motorcyclist Association 250 cc motocross national championship. Can-Am's motorcycle racing success enhanced the brand’s image.

In 1983, Can-Am released a 250 cc road racing bike. Using two 125 cc Rotax motors with a conjoined crankshaft, the bike featured a bespoke frame with an aluminum swingarm.

In 1987, BRP stopped Can-Am motorcycle production, and the brand entered a 19-year hiatus. In the late 1990s, BRP sold ATVs with "TTI" torsional trailing-arm rear suspension, utilizing two independent pivot points for increased comfort on rugged terrain.

In 1997, BRP began the production of ATV vehicles for the first time. In 1998, the company entered the all-terrain vehicle market by introducing a prototype of the Traxter, a utility based ATV. In 1999, the Traxter was named "ATV of the Year" by ATV Magazine. Later that year, BRP also began working on their second ATV, the performance-oriented DS650 that was designed for experienced sports enthusiasts. In 2004, this model won the Dakar Rally in the quad class.

BRP added an additional variation of the Traxter all-terrain vehicle in 2000 which was called the Traxter XL. The Traxter XL was the first ATV to feature a dumping box bed. In 2002, BRP introduced the Traxter MAX, which featured two seats. It was the first and only ATV with the manufacturer’s approval to accommodate two riders.

Rebranding and Spyder 
In 2006, it was announced that Bombardier ATV would become Can-Am ATV. Starting in 2007, BRP launched its all-terrain vehicle lineup and rebranded its ATV segment to Can-Am.

Just one year after announcing the rebranding, BRP inaugurated a new plant in Ciudad Juárez, Mexico. The new plant would oversee manufacturing and assembly of the Outlander and Renegade ATV models, including the Rotax engines that power them.

In 2007, Can-Am introduced its first on-road vehicle with The Spyder. With its unique Y-shaped layout, it was described as part motorcycle and part roadster; the latter is how the company refers to it. The Guinness World Record for the “Largest Parade of Can-Am Spyder Roadsters” was established in 2010 when 438 Can-Am Spyders paraded around Magog, Quebec.

2010 saw Can-Am's first side-by-side vehicle, the Commander. Shortly after its introduction, the Commander 1000 received the "Best of the Best" Award in the Side-by-Side vehicle category by Field & Stream magazine.

In 2013, Can-Am announced another side-by-side vehicle, the Maverick. The Maverick 1000R model was a performance-oriented side-by-side, competing against the Polaris RZR XP 1000 and the Arctic Cat Wildcat 1000 H.O. The Maverick featured the highest horsepower from a manufacturer at the time, making  from its 976 cc Rotax V-twin engine. The following year, Can-Am introduced the Maverick X ds Turbo, the first side-by-side to be equipped with a turbocharger from the factory. Its  Rotax 1000R turbocharged engine made it the highest horsepower side-by-side on the market, superseding the previous Maverick.

In 2016, Can-Am introduced the Defender in North America, its first utility side-by-side vehicle created specifically for farmers and hunters.

In 2018, the Can-Am Ryker was launched as a simpler, more easygoing counterpart to the Spyder.

Models

Tricycles

Spyder 
Having debuted in 2007, the Spyder motorized tricycle sold 2,500 units within seven months of the Spyder’s initial release date. By May 2009, Can-Am had already manufactured 12,500. In 2015, during the annual “Spyderfest” gathering in Springfield, Missouri, Can-Am delivered its 100,000th Can-Am Spyder.

Initially, the Spyder was powered by a liquid-cooled 900cc Rotax V-twin specifically modified for the vehicle to develop more low-end torque while meeting emissions standards. It has since been superseded by a 1330 cc Rotax engine.

The Spyder uses electronically-controlled power steering and high-performance Brembo brakes.

Spyder F3 

Spyder RT 
The Spyder RT is a touring-oriented model intended for optimal long-distance riding comfort. It is equipped with a different passenger back rest and adjustable wind deflectors.

Ryker 
The Ryker was launched in 2018 as a more affordable lower-tier version of the Spyder, intended for a younger entry-level demographic. It uses a continuously variable transmission.

The Rally Edition of the Ryker is a model outfitted for dirt roads, with reinforced wheels and dirt tires, a skid plate, rally handlebars with hand guards, and a "Max Mount" tail section for attaching cargo. Compared to the base Ryker 900, the Rally Edition has longer travel (6.38 inches vs. 5.39 inches) KYB suspension and an additional  of ground clearance.

Side-by-sides 
The first Can-Am manufacturer-approved four-wheeler able to handle two passengers arrived in 2002.

Renegade 
The 2007 Renegade 800 was a big-bore sport-recreational ATV engineered to create a thrilling ride. With a CVT sub-transmission with high, low, park, neutral & reverse, it offered a sporty riding stance more prone to aggressive trail tackling and equally suitable for dirt track racing. It was also suitable for rough terrain where other large vehicles would not fit. The Renegade 800 came with a small storage space and a rear rack.

Outlander 
The Outlander 800 was launched in 2006 with an 80-degree V-twin, using TTI suspension in the back and double A-arms in the front. It also had a Visco-Lok auto-locking differential. The 2022 Outlander MR model has a front differential.

Commander 
BRP launched two Commander models in 2011: the Commander 1000 and the Commander 800R. Convenience features included a dual-level cargo box.

The Commander X MR has its engine air intake positioned higher to prevent water and dirt from getting inside. The 2022 Commander XT-P model is equipped with Fox suspension, 15-inch wheels, and 30-inch tires. The base XT is available in either 1,000cc or 650cc guise, but the Max and XT-P are 1,000cc only.

Maverick 
In 2013, BRP launched the Maverick. The Maverick 1000R model was designed to compete against the Polaris RZR XP 900. At the time, the Maverick 1000R boasted the most horsepower in its class, from a 976 cc Rotax twin-cylinder engine. It gained attraction to its appearance and its dimensions (64 inches wide by 118'' long and 74'' high).

Defender 
The Can‑Am Defender vehicle was designed and engineered from the ground up, to establish new standards in terms of torque and power, as well as versatility to cater to all types of outdoor activities. BRP leveraged the Rotax engine technology to create a work-focused version of the durable V-Twin Rotax engines, calibrated to offer torque: the new Rotax 50-hp HD8 or 72-hp HD10 engines.

Community programs

International Female Ride Day 
Yearly on the first Saturday of May, Can-Am participates in the annual International Female Ride Day. In 2022, as part of the 16th edition, Can-Am female employees, ambassadors, dealers, and vehicle owners around the world rode together to celebrate the importance of female riders and their positive contributions to the industry.

Women of On-Road Program 
The Women of On-Road was created to help overcome the barriers that prevent women from experiencing the power of riding through inclusivity and education. To date, more than 12 500 people have joined the Women of On-Road community.

Responsible Rider 
BRP’s Responsible Rider Program stands to empower all riders to ride responsibly and build a more caring community and generate positive experiences. The Responsible Rider Program is about being an attentive rider and always considering safety, etiquette, and the environment, from the highway to city streets and everywhere in between.

Road Warrior Foundation 
On Veterans Day, Can-Am On-Road and the Road Warrior Foundation (RWF) give groups of veterans an adventure therapy experience of a lifetime during the RWF’s annual Road Warrior Ride.  The event started in 2014, to provide veterans with an opportunity to really feel the healing power that comes from escaping the ordinary and riding the open road on board Can-Am Spyder 3-Wheel Vehicles.

International Off-Road Day 
Off-road vehicle owners and adventure enthusiasts come together and enjoy the lifestyle and the off-road experiences on October 8. This event was launched for Can-Am to celebrate and take part in rides around the world . It also aims to encourage communities to come together and build awareness around access to trails and off-roading, which is in the same spirit as International Off-Road Day.

ATV racing 
Can-Am has been participating throughout the years from 2005 known to be a successful racing year for BRP and Can-Am until date, in different races such as Baja 500, Baja 1000, San Felipe 250, King of the Hammers, Vegas to Reno, Dakar Rally and many more.

In 2005, Antoine Morel of France successfully completed and won what is arguably the hardest off-road race in the world, the Dakar Rally, racing on a BRP DS 650 X. In late October, BRP won its first GNCC Racing Series Championship in the Utility Modified ATV Class on an Outlander 800 ATV. BRP earned a total of 12 GNCC Racing Championships in the following four seasons of GNCC Racing.

In 2006, Can-Am ATV earned another Dakar Rally win along with taking rest of the three positions on the podium in the ATV category. Juan Manuel Gonzales, Antoine Morel and Alain Morel, spent 16 challenging days and traversed more than 9,000 kilometers from Lisbon, Portugal, to Dakar, Senegal to earn a spot on the podium in the 2006 Dakar Rally aboard Can-Am all-terrain vehicles (ATVs).

In 2007, Rick Cecco, Michael Swift and Cliff Beasley piloted Can-AmTM OutlanderTM 800 ATVs to the front of the Utility Expert class in the 12 Hours of ATV America endurance race held  near Greenville, TX. The team never looked back and its lead was never in doubt for the entire duration of the race.[16]

As part of the Warnert Racing / Can-Am X-Team Grand National Cross Country (GNCC) team, Cecco, Swift and Beasley became a close-knit team as they raced with and against each other over the season. This edge added to the performance and reliability of the Can-Am ATVs led all three riders to win GNCC championships earlier this year and they were happy to add another trophy to the team's case.

In 2008, Can-Am TM DS 450 TM EFI ATV riders took the two top spots in the 2008 CMRC Canadian Pro 450 ATV championship. Can-Am X-Team racer and Québec native Richard Pelchat pulled the second-moto holeshot and dominated the rest of the field to win the overall race and championship at Ste-Julie near Montréal. It was Pelchat's sixth national championship and the first Canadian national championship for the DS 450. Michael Ouellete, who raced for NDB Sport / PLX Sport took second overall in the championship aboard his DS 450.

In 2009, Team Warnert Racing / Can-Am saw two big victories at the final round of the 2009 GNCC season near Crawfordsville, Indiana. The first saw Can-Am Outlander™ 800R EFI ATV rider Michael Swift completing a perfect season in the 4x4 Limited class at the Ironman GNCC, the second was Bryan Buckhannon's 4x4 Open championship - and morning overall victory - also on his Outlander 800R.

In the U2 class, Can-Am X-Team racer Jeremie Dudding took the victory on his Can-Am Renegade 800R EFI ATV. In the Women's Novice class, Cassie Carlson finished the season with a win aboard her Can-Am DS 450™ EFI ATV. Cliff Beasley, who already had the 4x4 Lites class championship, easily won his class aboard his Can-Am Outlander 500 EFI ATV. Wrapping up the weekend was Chris Bithell who narrowly missed out on an afternoon podium finishing fourth overall in the XC1 Pro class on his DS 450.

It was an extremely successful GNCC racing season for Can-Am as Outlander ATVs swept all three 4x4 class championships and the Renegade 800R won its first U2 class championship with Rick Cecco. In all, Can-Am took home four GNCC championships in 2009 and will be hunting for more in 2010.

In 2013, Can-Am ATV and side-by-side racers competed in the 46th Annual Tecate SCORE Baja 1000 desert endurance race in Mexico and came away with one class victory and third-place finish it the UTV class.Team UXC Racing/Can-Am racer Michael Swift rode the entire 833-mile course alone to win Class 26 aboard his Outlander 4x4 ATV.Cory Sappington also finished the race, earning third overall in Class 19 (UTV) with his Desert Toyz/Can-Am Maverick 1000R side-by-side vehicle.

Three Can-Am Outlander ATV and Grand National Cross Country racers made up the competitors for class 26. They consisted of Team UXC Racing/Can-Am team members Michael Swift and Don Higbee, who each raced alone on separate ATVs, as well as Penland Racing/Can-Am pilot Mike Penland and his squad. Swift, who won the 2013 GNCC U2 class championship on a Can-Am Renegade 4x4, held the lead for much of the race and finished averaging 26.6 mph.

Mitch Guthrie Jr. took the checkered flag for both 2018 and 2019 races at the Can-Am King of the Hammers UTV race.

In 2020, Can-Am dominated the Side-by-Side Category: First Place. Casey Currie (California, USA) and co-driver Sean Berriman (Las Vegas, USA) from the Monster Energy Can-Am race team took home first place, winning by 39 min. In Podium Sweep, Can-Am vehicles finished 1-2-3 for the second straight year. In Going 20 for 20, Can-Am vehicles crossed the finish line in all of the top 20 positions. This led to an overall domination: 29 of the top 31 race finishers were driving Can-Am vehicles.

In 2021, Francisco López, Juan Pablo Latrach Vinagre won the first place in the Dakar Rally held in Saudi Arabia in the combined Lightweight Vehicle category as well as the Side-by-Side class riding Maverick X3 SxS. Can-Am was also one of the top 11 finishers in class – 24 of 29 finishers were driving a Can-Am vehicle.

In 2022, Can-Am announced that factory racers scored victories in both desert and short course racing. Austin Weiland and his team secured the win in the Pro UTV Forced Induction class and UTV Overall at the 54th SCORE Baja 500, while Nick Bruce secured second in the Pro Stock UTV class. Kyle Chaney secured the win at the first round of the Short Course Championship Off-Road Series in Antigo.

The first round of the Short Course Championship Off-Road series kicked off in Wisconsin at Antigo Lions Roaring Raceway, where Can-Am Factory racer, Kyle Chaney, took the win in the Pro Turbo SxS class against a stacked field in Maverick X3.

Can-Am Off-Road scored their fifth consecutive Dakar Rally victory since 2018. Can-Am Factory South Racing driver Austin Jones (right) and his navigator, Gustavo Gugelmin, won the T4 category at the 2022 Dakar Rally in Saudi Arabia.

References 

Vehicle manufacturing companies established in 1973
Motorcycle manufacturers of Canada
Bombardier Recreational Products
Military motorcycles
Motor vehicle assembly plants in Canada
Canadian brands